Yufengwei station, is a station of Line 13 of the Guangzhou Metro. It started operations on 28 December 2017.

Station layout

Exits

References

Railway stations in China opened in 2017
Guangzhou Metro stations in Huangpu District